Konarlı is a village in the Tercan District, Erzincan Province, Turkey. The village is populated by Kurds of the Çarekan and Haydaran tribes and had a population of 161 in 2021.

The hamlets of Aktepe, Aslancayırı, Aşağıcemal, Aşağıkonarlı, Aşağıkuşluca, Bahçe, Beşparmak, Boğaziçi, Bük, Eğlence, Göl, Hacıhüseyin, Kamer, Karabaş, Karşıkarabaş, Kavacık, Közme, Kütuklü, Serince, Sümerli, Şakirağa, Tuğlu, Yukarıaktepe, Yukarıcemal and Yukarıkuşluca are attached to the village.

References 

Villages in Tercan District
Kurdish settlements in Erzincan Province